The 1998 season was the Cincinnati Bengals' 31st in professional football and their 29th in the National Football League (NFL). The Bengals finished with a 3–13 record for the fourth time in the 1990s, as new free agent QB Neil O'Donnell was sacked 30 times. Despite the poor showing by the offensive line, running back Corey Dillon established himself as one of the NFL's premier running backs, as he rushed for 1,120 yards. The only bright spot for the Bengals in 1998 was when they swept division rival Pittsburgh. This was the Bengals only sweep of the Steelers during the "Bungles" years.

Offseason

NFL Draft

Personnel

Staff

Roster

Regular season

Schedule

Standings

Team leaders

Passing

Rushing

Receiving

Defensive

Kicking and punting

Special teams

Awards and records
Carl Pickens, franchise record, most receptions in one game, 13 (achieved on October 11, 1998)

Milestones
Corey Dillon, 2nd 1,000-yard rushing season (1,130 rushing yards) 
Carl Pickens, 4th 1,000-yard receiving season (1,023 receiving yards) 
Chad Cornelius, led NFL in punt average in the preseason before tearing the ACL/MCL on his kicking leg. Was the first punter to down his own punt.

References

External links
 
 1998 Cincinnati Bengals at Pro-Football-Reference.com

Cincinnati Bengals
Cincinnati Bengals seasons
Cincin